Oscar Heisserer (18 July 1914 – 7 October 2004) was a French footballer.

Born in Schirrhein, Alsace-Lorraine, he played for RC Strasbourg, and appeared for France in the 1938 World Cup, where he scored a goal. He died in Strasbourg.

References

 Profile
 Profile and stats

1914 births
2004 deaths
1938 FIFA World Cup players
Association football midfielders
Footballers from Alsace
France international footballers
French football managers
French footballers
French people of German descent
Ligue 1 players
Olympique Lyonnais managers
Olympique Lyonnais players
People from Alsace-Lorraine
Sportspeople from Bas-Rhin
Racing Club de France Football players
RC Strasbourg Alsace managers
RC Strasbourg Alsace players